Arnoldius is a genus of ants in the subfamily Dolichoderinae. Its three species are known from Australia.

Species
 Arnoldius flavus (Crawley, 1922)
 Arnoldius pusillus (Mayr, 1876)
 Arnoldius scissor (Crawley, 1922)

References

External links

Dolichoderinae
Ant genera
Hymenoptera of Australia